is a railway station on the Hankyu Railway Kyoto Line located in Ibaraki, Osaka Prefecture, Japan.

Lines
Hankyu Railway Kyoto Line

Layout
The elevated station consists of three levels:
 1st level (ground): Rosavia Ibaraki shopping center
 2nd level: Station facilities (concourses, ticket gates and offices) and Rosavia Ibaraki shopping center
 3rd level: Platforms and tracks
There are two island platforms, each of which serves two tracks.

History 
Ibaraki-shi Station opened on 16 January 1928.

Station numbering was introduced to all Hankyu stations on 21 December 2013 with this station being designated as station number HK-69.

Stations next to Ibaraki-shi

References

External links
 Ibaraki-shi Station from Hankyu Railway website

Ibaraki, Osaka
Railway stations in Japan opened in 1928
Hankyu Kyoto Main Line
Railway stations in Osaka Prefecture